The 2020 World Junior Ice Hockey Championship Division II consisted of two tiered groups of six teams each: the fourth-tier Division II A and the fifth-tier Division II B. For each tier's tournament, the team which placed first was promoted to the next highest division, while the team which placed last was relegated to a lower division.

To be eligible as a junior player in these tournaments, a player couldn't be born earlier than 2000.

Division II A

The Division II A tournament was played in Vilnius, Lithuania, from 6 to 12 January 2020.

Participants

Match officials
Four referees and 7 linesmen were selected for the tournament.

Referees
 Niki De Herdt
 Niclas Lundsgaard
 Tilen Pahor
 Turo Virta

Linesmen
 Joris Barcelo
 Karolis Janušauskas
 Herman Johansen
 Norbert Muzsik
 Laurynas Stepankevičius
 Nikita Vilyugin
 Dāvis Zunde

Standings

Results
All times are local (UTC+2).

Statistics

Top 10 scorers

GP = Games played; G = Goals; A = Assists; Pts = Points; +/− = Plus-minus; PIM = Penalties In Minutes
Source: IIHF.com

Goaltending leaders
(minimum 40% team's total ice time)

TOI = Time on ice (minutes:seconds); GA = Goals against; GAA = Goals against average; Sv% = Save percentage; SO = Shutouts
Source: IIHF.com

Awards
Best Players Selected by the Directorate
 Goaltender:  Eiki Sato
 Defenceman:  Paulius Rumševičius
 Forward:  Chikara Hanzawa
Source: IIHF

Division II B

The Division II B tournament was played in Gangneung, South Korea, from 27 January to 3 February 2020.

Participants

Match officials
4 referees and 7 linesmen were selected for the tournament.

Referees
 Stefan Hogarth
 Benas Jakšys
 Liu Ren
 Andrew Wilk

Linesmen
 Chae Young-jin
 Yong Elbert Cheah
 Ryan Fraley
 Go Hashimoto
 James Ions
 Li Lintai
 Seo Kwang-suk

Standings

Results 
 All times are local (UTC+9).

Statistics

Top 10 scorers

GP = Games played; G = Goals; A = Assists; Pts = Points; +/− = Plus-minus; PIM = Penalties In Minutes
Source: IIHF

Goaltending leaders
(minimum 40% team's total ice time)

TOI = Time on ice (minutes:seconds); GA = Goals against; GAA = Goals against average; Sv% = Save percentage; SO = Shutouts
Source: IIHF

Awards
Best Players Selected by the Directorate
 Goaltender:  Kim Hyung-chan
 Defenceman:  Lee Min-jae
 Forward:  Dominic Čanić
Source: IIHF

References

II
2020
World Junior Ice Hockey Championships
World Junior Ice Hockey Championships
2019–20 in South Korean ice hockey
2019–20 in Lithuanian ice hockey
International ice hockey competitions hosted by Lithuania
International ice hockey competitions hosted by South Korea
Sports competitions in Vilnius
Sports competitions in Gangneung